Baston is a surname. Notable people with the surname include:

Bert Baston (1894–1979), footballer
Caroline Baston (born 1956), former Archdeacon of the Isle of Wight
Daniel Baston (born 1973), footballer
Guillaume-André-Réné Baston (1741–1825), theologian
John Baston (1708–1739), Baroque composer
Josquin Baston (c. 1515 – c. 1576), Dutch composer
Maceo Baston (born 1976), basketballer
Philip Baston (died c. 1320), cleric
Robert Baston (fl. 1300), Carmelite friar
Vin Baston (1919–1963), sportsperson
Borja González, known as Borja Bastón (born 1992), Spanish footballer